The 2021 Drive for the Cure 250 was a NASCAR Xfinity Series race that was held on October 9, 2021, at the Charlotte Motor Speedway in Concord, North Carolina. Contested over 68- extended from 67 laps due to an overtime finish—laps on the  road course, it was be the 29th race of the 2021 NASCAR Xfinity Series season, the third race of the Playoffs, and the final race of the Round of 12.

Report

Background
Since 2018, deviating from past NASCAR events at Charlotte, the race will utilize a road course configuration of Charlotte Motor Speedway, promoted and trademarked as the "Roval". The race will be contested over a scheduled distance of 109 laps, .

During July 2018 tests on the road course, concerns were raised over drivers "cheating" the backstretch chicane on the course. The chicanes were modified with additional tire barriers and rumble strips in order to encourage drivers to properly drive through them, and NASCAR will enforce drive-through penalties on drivers who illegally "short-cut" parts of the course. The chicanes will not be used during restarts.  In the summer of 2019, the bus stop on the backstretch was changed and deepened, becoming a permanent part of the circuit, compared to the previous year where it was improvised.

If a driver fails to legally make the backstretch bus stop, the driver must skip the frontstretch chicane and make a complete stop by the dotted line on the exit before being allowed to continue.  A driver who misses the frontstretch chicane must stop before the exit.

Entry list 

 (R) denotes rookie driver.
 (i) denotes driver who is ineligible for series driver points.

Qualifying
Austin Cindric was awarded the pole for the race as determined by competition-based formula. Timmy Hill did not have enough points to qualify for the race.

Starting Lineups

Race

Race results

Stage Results 
Stage One
Laps: 20

Stage Two
Laps: 20

Final Stage Results 

Laps: 27

Race statistics 

 Lead changes: 6 among 5 different drivers
 Cautions/Laps: 7 for 13
 Time of race: 2 hours, 7 minutes, and 14 seconds
 Average speed:

References 

NASCAR races at Charlotte Motor Speedway
Drive for the Cure 250
Drive for the Cure 250
2021 NASCAR Xfinity Series